The Order of the Oriental Republic of Uruguay was a decoration created by the 1973-1985 civic-military dictatorship to award to foreign personalities for extraordinary meritorious acts rendered to the country or for reciprocity purposes. It was eliminated after the repeal of the rule that created it by Law No. 15738. In 1992 the Medal of the Oriental Republic of Uruguay was created.

Institution of order
The order was instituted in the year 1984 by the civilian-military administration that ruled the Republic of Uruguay. After the transition from the civilian-military administration in 1985, the order was suppressed.

Ranks 
This order consisted of the following grades or ranks:
 Collar 
 Grand Cross 
 Sash (only for women) 
 Commander 
 Officer 
 Knight

Features

Cross description

The blue and white cross has an enemelled Uruguayan coat of arms in the centre. The cross is topped by a Sun of May in silver or gold.

Ribbon

See also

 Sun of May#Historical reference

References

Republic, Order
Awards established in 1984
1984 establishments in Uruguay
1985 disestablishments in Uruguay